Bridget Meehan Brennan (née Bridget Maeve Meehan, born 1974) is an American lawyer from Ohio who serves as a United States district judge of the United States District Court for the Northern District of Ohio. She served as acting United States Attorney for the Northern District of Ohio from 2021 to 2022.

Education 

Brennan received her Bachelor of Arts from John Carroll University in 1997 and her Juris Doctor from the Case Western Reserve University School of Law in 2000.

Legal career 

Brennan was previously an associate at BakerHostetler in Cleveland from 2000 to 2007. She served in the U.S. Attorney's office from 2007 to 2022, including First Assistant United States Attorney from 2018 to 2021, Chief of the Criminal Division from 2017 to 2018, Chief of the Civil Rights unit from 2015 to 2017, and ethics advisor from 2013 to 2018. From January 2021 to February 2022, she served as the Acting United States Attorney, and in turn chief federal law enforcement officer for the Northern District of Ohio.

Federal judicial service 

On September 30, 2021, President Joe Biden nominated Brennan to serve as a United States district judge of the United States District Court for the Northern District of Ohio. President Biden nominated Brennan to the seat vacated by Judge Dan A. Polster, who assumed senior status on January 31, 2021. On November 17, 2021, a hearing on her nomination was held before the Senate Judiciary Committee.  On December 16, 2021, her nomination was favorably reported out of committee by a 16–6 vote. On January 3, 2022, her nomination was returned to the President under Rule XXXI, Paragraph 6 of the United States Senate; she was renominated the same day. 

On January 13, 2022, her nomination was reported out of committee by a 15–7 vote. On January 31, 2022, the Senate invoked cloture on her nomination by a 61–30 vote. On February 1, 2022, her nomination was confirmed by a 61–35 vote. She received her judicial commission on February 8, 2022.

References

External links 

1974 births
Living people
20th-century American women lawyers
20th-century American lawyers
21st-century American women lawyers
21st-century American judges
21st-century American lawyers
21st-century American women judges
Assistant United States Attorneys
Case Western Reserve University School of Law alumni
John Carroll University alumni
Judges of the United States District Court for the Northern District of Ohio
Ohio lawyers
People associated with BakerHostetler
People from Camp Hill, Pennsylvania
United States Attorneys for the Northern District of Ohio
United States district court judges appointed by Joe Biden